Jack Breslin (born 6 April 1997) is a Scottish professional footballer who plays as a defender for Petershill.

Club career
Breslin began his career with  Celtic, and has two loan spells with Annan Athletic, the first from January 2015, and the second from February 2016. He signed for Hamilton Academical in July 2016. He was released by Hamilton at the end of the 2016–17 season, subsequently signing for Scottish League Two club Clyde on 7 June 2017. Breslin left Clyde in May 2018, following the end of his contract. Breslin signed with Cambuslang Rangers in June 2018 before moving to Edusport in February 2019. West of Scotland team Petershill announced the signing of Breslin on 24 July 2020.

International career
Breslin has represented Scotland at various youth international levels – under-15, under-16, under-17, and under-19.

Career statistics

References

1997 births
Living people
Scottish footballers
Celtic F.C. players
Annan Athletic F.C. players
Hamilton Academical F.C. players
Clyde F.C. players
Scottish Professional Football League players
Association football defenders
Scotland youth international footballers
Cambuslang Rangers F.C. players
Caledonian Braves F.C. players